OJSC KhK Yakutugol is a Russian coal company located in Neryungri, Yakutia. Yakutugol was established in 2002 by the public offering of the State-owned SUE Yakutugol.

Mechel owns 100% of its shares since October 2007. Mechel bought 25% of the company shares at an auction in 2005 for US$410 million and the rest 75% on October 5, 2007 for 58 billion rubles (together with Elgaugol).

The company's General Director is Igor Khafizov.

External links 

 Official site of OJSC "KhK "Yakutugol" 

Coal companies of Russia
Companies based in Sakha Republic
Mechel
Companies established in 2002
2002 establishments in Russia